Leonardo Caetano Manzi (born April 28, 1969) is a Brazilian football coach and a former player.

References

1969 births
Living people
Association football forwards
Brazilian footballers
Brazilian football managers
Vila Nova Futebol Clube players
Santos FC players
FC St. Pauli players
Hannover 96 players
Sport Club Internacional players
Esporte Clube Juventude players
Sociedade Esportiva do Gama players
SV Wilhelmshaven players
Bundesliga players
2. Bundesliga players
Brazilian expatriate footballers
Brazilian expatriate sportspeople in Germany
Expatriate footballers in Germany
Sportspeople from Goiânia